Las Piñas City National Science High School (Filipino: Mataas na Paaralang Pang-Agham ng Lungsod ng Las Piñas) is a science high school located in Carnival Park St., BF Resort Village, Brgy. Talon Dos, Las Piñas, Philippines. It is a specialized public high school concentrating in English, Mathematics, and Science. At present, it has approximately 800 students from Grade 7 to Grade 12. It is under the administration of the local government of Las Piñas and is recognized by the Department of Education.

Timeline

February 19, 2007
 Establishment of Las Piñas Science High School through R.A. 9451

June 8, 2009
 Opening of classes
 The first 24 students were temporarily housed at Las Piñas East National High School - Talon Village Annex.

July 30, 2009
 Inauguration of the Las Piñas Science High School Building at Carnival Park St., BF Resort Village, Talon Dos, Las Piñas, Metro Manila

On December 23, 2013, 31 out of 85 students who took the University of the Philippines College Admission Test passed the most prestigious and competitive college entrance test in the country. Las Piñas City National Science High School had an increase of 76.92% of passers this year, the highest increase of passers among the science high schools in the National Capital Region.

Achievements
 2011 LIYAB NCR-Wide News Writing Contest 1st Place (Journalism)
 2011 LIYAB NCR-Wide Sports Writing Contest 3rd Place (Journalism)
 2011 LIYAB NCR-Wide Feature Writing Contest 10th Place (Journalism)
 Teodoro F. Valencia, 'DepEd Search for NCR's 10 Outstanding Campus Journalists and School Publications, Editorial Page, 2nd Place (Lapiscian Scroll)
 Mr. School Ambassador 2011
 Ms. School Ambassador 2011-1st Runner Up
2012 Project Citizen Tan Yan Kee Award for Science 
2012 Project Citizen NCR Showcase 2nd Place 
2013 Project Citizen Tan Yan Kee Award for Environment (Team B)
2013 Project Citizen NCR Showcase 2nd Place (Team A)

Las Piñas City National Science High School Hymn
Composed by Reynaldo Gayas Jr. and Ronel Balistoy
Hymned by Larry Byl Cuenca

Beloved Alma Mater, 
We lift our voices high
We sing the praise of gratitude 
As we soar the azure sky

Hail to thee, Alma Mater 
We'll bring your legacy
Amidst all our adversities
Herald LPScience still

Thou nourish us with hopes and dreams
With a fervor compassion
Thou teach us see the difference
The truth shall still remain

Oh hail to thee, LPSci
A great noblesse oblige
An inspiration to all of us
We'll keep you eternally

Las Piñas Science High
Abode of learning excellence
Las Piñas Science High
Haven for holistic growth

Las Piñas Science High
Abode of learning excellence
Las Piñas Science High
We'll keep you eternally

References

External links

Official website

Science high schools in Metro Manila
Schools in Las Piñas
Educational institutions established in 2009
2009 establishments in the Philippines